The 2013 Formula 3 Australian Drivers' Championship was a CAMS sanctioned Australian motor racing title, the winner of which was awarded the 2013 CAMS Gold Star. It was the 57th Australian Drivers' Championship and the ninth to be contested with open wheel racing cars constructed in accordance with FIA Formula 3 regulations. The championship began on 29 March at the Mount Panorama Circuit and ended on 17 November at Sandown Raceway after seven rounds across five different states and territories. Formula 3 Management Pty Ltd was appointed by CAMS as the Category Manager for the Championship.

With nine victories and nine second places, Tim Macrow won his second Australian Drivers' Championship title by 32 points ahead of seven-time race winner John Magro, while Nick Foster rounded out the top three placings, with two race victories to his name. The only other race winners during the season were Nathan Morcom and James Winslow, who each won a race at the Mount Panorama round.

Race calendar
The championship was contested over a seven-round series.

Teams and drivers
The following teams and drivers contested the 2013 Australian Drivers' Championship.

Classes
Competing cars were nominated into one of three classes:
 Australian Formula 3 Championship – for automobiles constructed in accordance with the FIA Formula 3 regulations that applied in the year of manufacture between 1 January 2002 and 31 December 2011.
 National Class – for automobiles constructed in accordance with the FIA Formula 3 regulations that applied in the year of manufacture between 1 January 1999 and 31 December 2004.
 Invitational Class.

Points system
Outright championship points were awarded as follows:
 One point was awarded to the driver placed in the highest grid position for the first race at each round.
 20–15–12–10–8–6–4–3–2–1 for the first ten finishing positions in each race of a round which comprised two races.
 12–9–8–7–6–5–4–3–2–1 for the first ten finishing position in the first two races of a round which comprised three races.
 20–15–12–10–8–6–4–3–2–1 basis for the first ten finishing position in the third race of a round which comprised three races.
 One point was awarded to the driver setting the fastest lap time in each race.

Points towards the National Class award were allocated on the same basis as used for the outright championship.

Results

Australian Drivers' Championship

Race 2 at the Mount Panorama round was stopped due to rain after eight of the scheduled thirteen laps had been completed and half points were awarded.

National Class
The National Class award was won by Arrie Maree (247 points) from Todd Hazelwood (214.5), Jon Collins (192) and Nathan Gotch (24).

Invitation Class
No drivers earned points in the Invitation Class at any round.

See also
 Australian Drivers' Championship
 Australian Formula 3

References

External links
 
 Online race results at www.natsoft.com.au

Australian Drivers' Championship
Drivers' Championship
Australian Formula 3 seasons
Australia
Australian Formula 3